The biathlon competition of the Vancouver 2010 Paralympics was held at Whistler, British Columbia. The events were held on 13 March and 17 March 2010.

Medal table

Events
The program includes a total of 12 events, 6 for men and 6 for women. Competitors are divided into three categories: standing, visually impaired, and sitting. Standing biathletes are those that have a locomotive disability but are able to use the same equipment as able-bodied skiers, while sitting competitors use a sitski. Skiers with a visual impairment compete with the help of a sighted guide and an acoustic aiming system. The skier with the visual impairment and the guide are considered a team, and dual medals are awarded.

Men
 3 km×2 pursuit
 Standing
 Visually impaired
 Sitting
 12.5 km individual
 Standing
 Visually impaired
 Sitting

Women
 3 km×2 pursuit
 Standing
 Visually impaired
 Sitting
 12.5 km individual
 Standing
 Visually impaired
 10 km individual
 Sitting

Women's events

Men's events

See also
Biathlon at the 2010 Winter Olympics

References

Biathlon (Paralympic) - Sports - Vancouver 2010
Biathlon (Paralympic) Schedule

External links 

 
2010 Winter Paralympics events
Winter Paralympics
2010
Biathlon competitions in Canada